Supply and Demand is the second album by singer-songwriter Amos Lee, which was released on October 3, 2006. The first single from the album was "Shout Out Loud". Two songs are available for listening on Amos' official website. The album was produced by former Wallflowers and Natalie Merchant bassist Barrie Maguire.

Track listing
All songs written by Amos Lee
"Shout Out Loud" – 3:52
"Sympathize" – 3:08
"Freedom" – 3:08
"Careless" – 4:45
"Skipping Stone" – 2:19
"Supply and Demand" – 3:21
"Sweet Pea" – 2:10
"Night Train" – 3:32
"Southern Girl" – 3:24
"The Wind" – 4:31
"Long Line of Pain" – 3:01
Two bonus tracks: Truth & Lullaby are available on iTunes.

Personnel
Amos Lee – Guitar, vocals, tenor guitar, vocorgan, drums, baritone guitar
Nate Skiles – Guitar, mandolin, background vocals
Jaron Olevsky – Bass guitar, piano, background vocals
Fred Berman – Drums, background vocals
Chris Joyner – Hammond B3, piano, Wurlitzer
Pete Thomas – Drums
David Kalish – Dobro
Greg Leisz – Steel guitar
John Austin Hughes – Ukulele
Lizz Wright – Background vocals
Priscilla Ahn – Background vocals
Barrie Maguire – Bass guitar, producer, engineering
Danny Markowitz – A&R
Shane Smith – Engineer
Jim Bottari – Engineer

Chart performance

External links
 "Sympathize" and "Shout Out Loud"

2006 albums
Amos Lee albums
Blue Note Records albums